This is a list of United States national Golden Gloves champions in the welterweight division, along with the state or region they represented.

1928 – Nick Fosco – Chicago
1929 – Bud Hammer – Chicago
1930 – Karl Ogren – Chicago
1931 – George Keenan – Chicago
1932 – Johnny Phagan – Chicago
1933 – Henry Rothier – Davenport
1934 – Danny Farrar – Cleveland
1935 – King Wyatt – Fort Wayne
1936 – Chester Rutecki – Chicago
1937 – Verne Patterson – Chicago
1938 – James O'Malley – Chicago
1939 – Milton Jones – St. Louis
1940 – Savior Canadeo – Chicago
1941 – Geo. W. Horne, Jr. – Cleveland
1942 – Bob Burns – Fort Wayne
1943 – Ballessando Carubia – Chicago
1944 – Yevi Soluthali – Peoria
1945 – Gilbert Garcia – Fort Worth
1946 – Julius Menendez – Chicago
1947 – John Keough – Cleveland
1948 – Richard Guerrero – Chicago
1949 – Richard Guerrero – Chicago
1950 – Dick Anderson – Cleveland
1951 – Willard Henry – Kansas City
1952 – Herschel Acton – Los Angeles
1953 – Richard Wall  – Oklahoma City
1954 – Rudy Sawyer – Great Lakes
1955 – Richard Wall – Tulsa
1956 – Leon Brooks – St. Louis
1957 – Joe Shaw – Kansas City
1958 – Dave Holman – Toledo
1959 – Don Sargeant – Minneapolis
1960 – Fred Hernandez – Omaha
1961 – Roy McMillian – Toledo
1962 – Rory O'Shea – Chicago
1963 – Wade Smith – Muncie
1964 – Don Cobbs – St. Louis
1965 – Don Cobbs – St. Louis
1966 – Hedgeman Lewis – Detroit
1967 – Pat O'Connor – Rochester, MN
1968 – Richard Royal – Charlotte
1969 – David Oropeza – Salt Lake City
1970 – Melvin Dennis – Fort Worth
1971 – Larry Carlisle – Charlotte
1972 – Jesse Valdez – Las Vegas
1973 – Harold Beal – Kansas City
1974 – Clinton Jackson – Las Vegas
1975 – Clinton Jackson – Knoxville
1976 – Clinton Jackson – Knoxville
1977 – Mike McCallum – Miami
1978 – Jeffrey Stoudemire – Cleveland
1979 – Mike McCallum – Knoxville
1980 – Donald Curry – Fort Worth
1981 – Manuel Vallejo – Los Angeles
1982 – Roman George – Lafayette
1983 – Louis Howard – St. Louis
1984 – Mylon Watkins – Las Vegas
1985 – Anthony Stephens – Louisiana
1986 – Frank Liles – Syracuse
1987 – Roger Turner – Grand Rapids
1988 – Ron Morgan, Jr. – Louisville
1989 -- James Myers --  Los Angeles, California
1990 – Nathan Fortier– Michigan
1991 – Ross Thompson—{Florida}
1992 – Stephen Golisano – East Boston MA
1993 – David Reid – Pennsylvania
1993 - Anthony W Melberg - Barstow, California
1994 – Anulfo Vasquez – New Jersey
1995 – Anulfo Vasquez – New Jersey
1996 – Brandon Mitchell – Knoxville
1997 – Cory Spinks, St. Louis
1998 – Anthony Hanshaw – Cleveland
1999 – James Erminger Louisiana 
2000 – Anthony Thompson – Pennsylvania
2001 – James Parison – California
2002 – Durrell Richardson – Cleveland
2003 – Andre Berto – Florida
2004 – Daniel Jacobs – NY Metro
2005 – Brad Solomon – Mid-South
2006 – Demetrius Andrade – New England
2007 – Demetrius Andrade – New England
2008 – James Brumley- Manchester Ky
2009 – Errol Spence – Desoto, TX
2010 – David Grayton – DC
2011 – Arturo Trujillo - Pennsylvania
2012 - Alex Martin - Illinois
2013 - Erickson Lubin - Orlando, Florida
2014 - Sammy Valentin - Tampa, Florida
2015 - Rashid Stevens - Ohio
2016 - Brian Ceballo - New York City
2017 - Leon Lawson III - Flint, Michigan
2018 - Samuel Sadowsky - {West Palm Beach, FL}

References

Golden Gloves